Personal initiative (PI) is self-starting and proactive behavior that overcomes barriers to achieve a goal. The concept was developed by Michael Frese and coworkers in the 1990s .

The three facets of PI – self-starting, future oriented, and overcoming barriers form a syndrome of proactive behaviors relating to each other empirically. Self-starting implies that the goals are set by an individual themselves and not by someone else. These self-started goals are often related to future orientation that involves having long-term focus and preparation for future demands and problems. Future demands can be met by proactive actions – 'pro' meaning preparatory or beforehand in Greek. Thus, a proactive approach attempts to get pre-signals signifying future obstacles and developing plans to prevent them. Implementation of long-term goals often leads to new setbacks.  Initiative, therefore, implies that one will overcome these barriers actively and persistently.

PI stands in contrast to a passive approach, which is characterized by doing what one is told, giving up when faced with difficulties, and reacting to environmental demands. Proponents of PI have argued that it may become more important in future workplaces as they require a high degree of self-reliance.

PI is often conceptualized as the behavioral component of the general proactivity concept; it is also related but not identical to work engagement.

Relevance 
PI is developed as a performance outcome within the action (regulation) theory tradition. While PI is consistently linked to higher work performance and innovativeness of individuals, it also interacts with other types of constructs of intrinsic motivation. The PI concept was used to create an effective training tool, which is now being used to help thousands of entrepreneurs and organisations in developing countries to improve their businesses.

Climate 
PI Climate refers to formal and informal organizational practices which guide and support a proactive, self-starting, and persistent approach toward work. Studies have shown that individual personal initiative is related to idea generation, entrepreneurial success , and innovation implementation behavior. Similarly, a climate that fosters personal initiative helps to predict radical innovation as well as profitability of firms. As problems appear during the implementation of an innovation, innovation paired with a low level of climate for initiative may negatively affect company performance.

There may be higher uncertainty with new production systems leading to unexpected problems and barriers that need to be overcome; PI climate helps here to avoid production breakdowns. For firm performance there is an interaction between process innovation and climate for personal initiative - climate for personal initiative functions as a moderator. Organizations that display a work environment characterized by personal initiative have a higher chance of promoting the effectiveness of process innovations.

Facets of PI 
PI suggests a model for training with action sequence goal setting, information gathering and prognosis, plan development and execution, plan monitoring, and feedback processing. The facet theory of PI  depicted in the table provides a general concept of active performance from an action theory perspective. Every step of the action sequence can be supported by PI.

Training entrepreneurs 
PI was used to create an effective training tool for entrepreneurs and micro-businesses in developing countries to improve their effectiveness. PI training has been studied with randomized controlled trials and shown to be successful. It leads to a proactive entrepreneurial mindset. Participants learn ways to set themselves apart from other businesses, as well as to anticipate problems, overcome setbacks, improve opportunity planning skills, and do other long-term planning. Not every experiment on PI training was successful, however the impact of personal initiative training was higher in a large randomised controlled filed experiment than Traditional Business training.

Consequences

Positive outcomes 
PI likely affects careers positively via several avenues.

 Innovative goals, clear career plans and a high degree of execution.
 People with high PI are perceived to be better in their employability.
 People with high PI are politically more savvy, more innovative, and show more initiative advancing their careers.
 The proactive career concept includes a certain amount of initiative and has been shown to be related to career progression.
 It helps that PI is related to performance, both in the role of employee as well as in the role of entrepreneur.
 PI is related to continuous education so that individuals are able to work more effectively.

Potentially negative outcomes 
PI can also have negative outcomes for employees. Showing PI can be harmful on different levels: for the employees themselves, for teammates, and for the entire organization. If management expects employees to be proactive, it may burden employees with extreme aspirations. On the organizational level, high PI among employees may reduce the possibility of the organizations to control and to socialize members of the organization.

References 

Human behavior